Psammoecus is a genus of beetles in the family Silvanidae, containing the following species:

 Psammoecus alluaudi Grouvelle
 Psammoecus amoenus Grouvelle
 Psammoecus andrewesi Grouvelle
 Psammoecus angulatus Grouvelle
 Psammoecus antennatus Waterhouse
 Psammoecus bambusae Pal
 Psammoecus bhutanicus 
 Psammoecus biangulatus Grouvelle
 Psammoecus biapicallis Arrow
 Psammoecus bipunctatus Fabricius
 Psammoecus blandus Grouvelle
 Psammoecus breviusculus Reitter
 Psammoecus brunnescens Grouvelle
 Psammoecus complexus Pal
 Psammoecus concolor Grouvelle
 Psammoecus convexus Grouvelle
 Psammoecus crassus Grouvelle
 Psammoecus decoratus Grouvelle
 Psammoecus delicatus Grouvelle
 Psammoecus dentatus Grouvelle
 Psammoecus elegans Grouvelle
 Psammoecus excellens Grouvelle
 Psammoecus eximius Grouvelle
 Psammoecus fairmairei Grouvelle
 Psammoecus fasciatus Reitter
 Psammoecus felix Waterhouse
 Psammoecus gentilis Grouvelle
 Psammoecus grandis Grouvelle
 Psammoecus gratiosus Grouvelle
 Psammoecus hacquardi Grouvelle
 Psammoecus harmandi Grouvelle
 Psammoecus hirsutus Olliff
 Psammoecus impressicollis Grouvelle
 Psammoecus incertior Blackburn
 Psammoecus incommodus Walker
 Psammoecus inflatus Grouvelle
 Psammoecus insularis Sharp
 Psammoecus khasia Pal
 Psammoecus laetulus Grouvelle
 Psammoecus lancifer Grouvelle
 Psammoecus lateralis Grouvelle
 Psammoecus lepidus Grouvelle
 Psammoecus lineatus Grouvelle
 Psammoecus longicornis Schauffuss
 Psammoecus major Grouvelle
 Psammoecus marginatus Grouvelle
 Psammoecus marginicollis Grouvelle
 Psammoecus nitescens Grouvelle
 Psammoecus nitidior Grouvelle
 Psammoecus nitidus Grouvelle
 Psammoecus obesus Grouvelle
 Psammoecus oblitus Grouvelle
 Psammoecus obscurus Arrow
 Psammoecus ornatus Grouvelle
 Psammoecus pallidipennis Blackburn
 Psammoecus parallelus Grouvelle
 Psammoecus pascoei Grouvelle
 Psammoecus personatus Grouvelle
 Psammoecus piceus Grouvelle
 Psammoecus pictus Waterhouse
 Psammoecus pradieri Grouvelle
 Psammoecus quadrimaculatus Reitter
 Psammoecus quadrinotatus Grouvelle
 Psammoecus raffrayi Grouvelle
 Psammoecus reitteri Grouvelle
 Psammoecus rotundicollis Grouvelle
 Psammoecus serrulatus Montrouzier
 Psammoecus signatus Grouvelle
 Psammoecus simoni Grouvelle
 Psammoecus spinicollis Waterhouse
 Psammoecus spinosus Grouvelle
 Psammoecus stultus Grouvelle
 Psammoecus tereticollis Grouvelle
 Psammoecus tnotatus Blackburn
 Psammoecus triguttatus Reitter
 Psammoecus trilochana Pal
 Psammoecus trimaculatus Motschulsky
 Psammoecus vittifer Blackburn
 Psammoecus wittmeri Pal & Sen Gupta
 Psammoecus xnotatus Grouvelle

References

Silvanidae